Lennart Hansson may refer to
Lennart Hansson (footballer), Swedish association football player
Lennart Hansson (rower) (1931–2013), Swedish rower